Route 13, also known as the Chester Avenue Line, is a trolley line operated by the Southeastern Pennsylvania Transportation Authority (SEPTA) that connects the 13th Street station in downtown Philadelphia, Pennsylvania, with the Yeadon Loop in Yeadon, Pennsylvania, although limited service is available to the Darby Transportation Center in Darby, Pennsylvania. It is one of five lines that are part of the Subway-Surface Trolley system.

Route description
Starting from its eastern end at the 13th Street, Route 13 runs in a tunnel under Market Street. It makes stops at underground stations at 15th Street, 19th Street, 22nd Street, 30th Street, and 33rd Street.  From 15th to 30th Streets, it runs on the outer tracks in the same tunnel as SEPTA's Market–Frankford Line.

Passengers may transfer free of charge to the Market–Frankford Line at 13th, 15th, and 30th Streets and to the Broad Street Line at 15th Street.  Connections to the SEPTA Regional Rail are also available.  Underground passageways connect the 13th and 15th Street Stations to Jefferson Station and Suburban Station.

Route 13 surfaces at the 40th Street Portal near 40th Street and Baltimore Avenue (US 13), and then runs southwest along Woodland Avenue shortly before moving to Chester Avenue. An alternate trolley line existing along 42nd Street itself joins the Route 13 line for several blocks. This line is used when tunnels are closed for maintenance or other unforeseen shutdowns. The line runs on a bridge over the Media/Wawa Line at 49th Street, however, it does not serve as an official stop for the trolley. The alternate trolley line for tunnel closings turns along 49th Street itself before Route 13 crosses the 49th Street Station railroad bridge, although some Route 11 trolleys use these tracks.

Mt. Moriah Cemetery cuts off Chester Avenue, so the line makes a left turn at 60th Street then returns to the southwest at Kingsessing Avenue. At the southwest corner of the cemetery, the Route 13 line stops at the Mt. Moriah Loop, and some use the loop for trolleys that do not go to either Yeadon or Darby. For those that do, the trolleys continue west on Kingsessing Avenue until it reaches 65th Street, where it turns north, and later northwest as it approaches a bridge over the Cobbs Creek Parkway, and immediately turns on another section of Chester Avenue, on its way to the Yeadon Loop. Fernwood-Yeadon (SEPTA station) is further north of this terminus and has no connection. However the SEPTA Suburban Bus Routes 68 and 108, which do lead to Fernwood-Yeadon cross the line east of Yeadon Loop at the Church Lane intersection.

West of Yeadon Loop, some trolleys continue along the Chester Avenue line until it reaches Cedar Avenue, where westbound and eastbound trolley lines split along 10th Street and 9th Street respectively. The tracks on 10th Street run straight, while those on 9th Street briefly run along Summit Street. As the westbound tracks turn left at the terminus of the 10th and Main Streets intersection, it runs south to the next block at Darby Transportation Center, which is primarily served by the SEPTA Route 11 line, as well as numerous buses.

History

Trolley service on Route 13 originally operated from Yeadon to Front & Chestnut Streets via Chestnut and Walnut Streets. Service was rerouted into the Subway-Surface Tunnel on September 9, 1956.

Service to was extended to Darby following the discontinuation of the Route 62 Darby–Yeadon shuttle trolley on January 24, 1971.

In 2021, SEPTA proposed rebranding their rail transit service as "SEPTA Metro", in order to make the system easier to navigate. Under this proposal, the subway–surface lines will be rebranded as the "T" lines with a green color and numeric suffixes for each service, and Route 13 would be renamed "T3 Chester Avenue." SEPTA described that "most comments were positive" in the public comment period for this rebranding project.

Stations and stops
All are in the City of Philadelphia or the boroughs of Yeadon or Darby.

References

External links

Official SEPTA Route 13 schedule and map

13
Tram routes in Philadelphia